Peter van Petegem (born 18 January 1970 in Brakel, Belgium) is a former professional road racing cyclist. Van Petegem last rode for Quick Step-Innergetic, in 2007. He lived in Horebeke.  He was a specialist in spring classics, one of ten riders to win the Tour of Flanders and Paris–Roubaix in the same season. He also earned a medal at the World Championship on two occasions; taking the silver in 1998 and winning the bronze in 2003. His last race was the GP Briek Schotte in Desselgem on 11 September 2007.

Major results

1991
 1st Internationale Wielertrofee Jong Maar Moedig
1994
  1st Scheldeprijs
1996
 1st Trofeo Luis Puig
 1st Stage 2 Danmark Rundt
1997
 1st Omloop Het Volk
 1st Trofeo Alcudia
 1st Trofeo Cala Millor
1998
 1st  Omnium, National Track Championships
 1st Omloop Het Volk
 1st Grote Prijs Beeckman-De Caluwé
 2nd  Road race, UCI Road World Championships
 3rd Road race, National Road Championships
1999
 1st  Overall Three Days of De Panne
 1st Tour of Flanders
 1st E3 Prijs Vlaanderen
 1st Gouden Pijl Emmen
2000
 1st Grand Prix d'Isbergues
 2nd Paris–Roubaix
 2nd Gent–Wevelgem
 2nd Dwars door Vlaanderen
2001
 1st Kuurne–Brussels–Kuurne
 1st Grand Prix d'Isbergues
 1st Stage 2 Paris–Nice
 6th Amstel Gold Race
2002
 1st  Overall Three Days of De Panne
1st Stage 3b
 1st Omloop Het Volk
 1st Stage 5 Tour de la Région Wallonne
 3rd Tour of Flanders
 6th Amstel Gold Race
 7th Liège–Bastogne–Liège
2003
 1st Paris–Roubaix
 1st Tour of Flanders
 3rd  Road race, UCI Road World Championships
 3rd Overall Three Days of De Panne
 10th Paris–Tours
2004
 5th Amstel Gold Race
 6th Paris–Roubaix
 10t Milan–San Remo
2005
 3rd Tour of Flanders
 3rd E3 Prijs Vlaanderen
2006
 2nd Kuurne–Brussels–Kuurne
 4th Tour of Flanders

References

External links 
 Cyclingpost.com: Peter Van Petegem Profile
 Cyclingnews feature on Van Petegem's retirement

Belgian male cyclists
Cyclists at the 2000 Summer Olympics
Cyclists at the 2004 Summer Olympics
Olympic cyclists of Belgium
1970 births
Living people
Cyclists from East Flanders
People from Brakel